Gertrud Louise Goldschmidt (1 August 1912 – 17 September 1994), known as Gego, was a modern Venezuelan visual artist.  Gego is perhaps best known for her geometric and kinetic sculptures made in the 1960s and 1970s, which she described as "drawings without paper".

Early life
Gertrud Louise Goldschmidt, called "Gego", was born on 1 August 1912 in Hamburg, Germany into a Jewish family. She was the sixth of seven children of Eduard Martin Goldschmidt and Elizabeth Hanne Adeline Dehn. Although she was the niece of the medieval art historian Adolf Goldschmidt, who taught at the University of Berlin, she decided to attend the Technische Hochschule of Stuttgart in 1932, where she was taught by the well-known architect Paul Bonatz. In 1938, she earned a diploma in both architecture and engineering.

Because her family was Jewish, life became very difficult  once the Nazis gained power in 1934. Her German citizenship was nullified in 1935. Forced to leave Germany, she found work in 1939 as an architect in Venezuela.  Gego gained Venezuelan citizenship in 1952.  Her parents and siblings all managed to leave Germany by June 1940 mostly settling in England and California.  Some close relatives chose to stay in Germany unaware they would soon be murdered.  

In 1987, Professor Frithjof Trapp of the University of Hamburg led an investigation called "Exile and Emigration of Hamburg Jews", which he hoped would explain the lives of these Jews. Gego was one of the people who he hoped to investigate. After several letters to her home, Gego finally agreed to respond but the letter was never mailed and instead stayed in her collection of notes. In her testimony, "Reflection on my origins and encounters in life", Gego describes how her family identified with German society. She described, in detail, her education history and her departure from Germany.

Importance of education
After moving to Caracas, Venezuela, she taught at the College of Architecture and City Planning at the Central University of Venezuela between 1958 and 1967. Additionally, between 1964 and 1977, she taught at the Neumann Institute of Design in Caracas, an institution where many other renowned artists, such as Harry Abend, her fellow European-born artist, also taught. She taught "Bidimensional and Three-Dimensional Form" and "Spatial Solutions" and published two articles between 1971 and 1977.

In 1947, the Venezuelan president was overthrown by a military coup. Gego knew that, after a time of crisis, students are the members of society that are the most influential. Included in her Sabiduras, a folder of her informal writings discovered upon her death, there is a letter addressed to her colleagues explaining the criteria that would be beneficial to the students of Venezuela. In it, she explains that only through experience can artists, and architects in particular, learn their medium. Images and theories about architecture would not further their artistic training. Her views were fueled by her belief that students were taught with too much emphasis on rationality and were becoming "ignorant of imagination".

Career

Background 
Arriving in Venezuela during an economic boom, Gego was surrounded by artists who were enjoying a great deal of success. Modernism was the artistic fad sweeping through Latin America and artists in Venezuela participated enthusiastically. Modernism was a political tool as well. Latin American governments were trying to catch up to the advancements of the United States during the Post World War II era and Venezuela thought by encouraging the modern art movement, which incorporated ideas of the industry, science, and architecture, the country would be seen as progressive.

She made her first sculpture in 1957. She was aware of the modern movement when she came to Caracas, but she did not want to simply co-opt the ideas of Kinetic Art, Constructivism or Geometric Abstraction.  Instead, Gego wanted to create a style of her own because she was able to use so many aspects of her life in her art—for example, her German heritage. In the end, Gego saw that these new projects labeled desarrollista (developmentalist movement) were pleasing the elite and government, but she wanted an art that would relate to the local community of Venezuela.

Line 
From Kinetic Art, Gego incorporated the ideas of motion as well as the importance of experimentation and the spectator.  One of her earliest works, Esfera (Sphere) (1959), consists of welded brass and painted steel of different widths that are placed at different angles to one another in order to create overlapping lines and fields. When the viewer walks around the sphere, the visual relationship between the lines changes, creating a sense of motion.  Esfera echoes the work done by famous Kinetic artists like Carlos Cruz-Diez and Jesus Rafael Soto.  It was not until the mid-1960s that Gego departed from the basic concept of Kinetic Art in response to her developing ideas about lines.  For Gego, a line inhabited its own space, and as such, it was not a component in a larger work but instead it was a work by itself. Therefore, in her artworks, she did not use line to represent an image; line is the image.

The strength or purpose of the line was enhanced by her use of different materials, such as steel, wire, lead, nylon and various metals. In addition to relating to her interest in architecture, these materials also contradicted the new modernist movement in Latin America.  Gego not only used these materials to create lines in her massive sculptures but also in her series entitled Dibujos Sin Papel (Drawings without Paper).  These tiny works were created from scraps of metal that were bent and weaved together in order to evoke movement, experimentation and spontaneity.

While in Los Angeles in the late 1960s, Gego composed a series of lithographs that were mostly untitled except for a ten-page booked entitled, Lines in 1966.  This book is full of lithographs produced in gray and red. Variations in the thickness, length, and direction of the lines demonstrate the fundamental instability of line.  By experimenting with line in a different medium, Gego emphasized that the notion of "line" retains its strength and independence regardless of its specific location or form.

Space 
Gego's idea of a series artworks that would be titled "Drawings Without Paper" reflects on her view of space. Gego considered space as its own form; as if her artwork was occupying the artwork of the room itself.  Since her work is made from nets and grid-like materials, negative space is everywhere, causing the negative as well as the positive space to be appreciated.  But it is the shadows created by her works that reveal the integral connection between the sculpture and the room it occupies.  Gego is thus allowed to play with the idea of the stable and unstable elements of art.  The stable elements of art is the sculpture itself, while the unstable elements consist of the constantly changing shadows and the slight movement in her design due to the fragility of her materials.  In fact, the way her sculptures exist in space changes every time it was installed because Gego had the power to recreate the image as she wanted.

Tamarind Lithography Workshop 
On the invitation of June Wayne, Gego briefly visited Tamarind Lithography Workshop in Los Angeles (now Tamarind Institute) in 1963 and returned as an artist-fellow from November to December 1966, during which time she created thirty-one lithographs, including two books of lithographs.

Gego explained her interest in using non-traditional formats in her printmaking in a speech at Tamarind in 1966: "I think that series of sheets with a coherent meaning must be gathered in a way that they can be easily enjoyed so I make books."

As in her three-dimensional installations, Gego used printmaking as a mode of linear experimentation. The artist used line, and its infinite variations, to explore negative space, or what she called, the "nothing between the lines." At a reception honoring the artist at Tamarind in 1966 she explained, "I discovered that sometimes the in-between lines is as important as the lines by [themselves]."

Reticulárea 
Her series of Reticuláreas is undoubtedly her most popular and most talked about group of artworks.  Her first series was created in 1969.  Pieces of aluminum and steel were joined together to create an interweaving of nets and webs that fills the entire room when exhibited. Her use of repetition and layering in the massive structure causes the piece to seem endless.  Indeed, Gego's attention to line and space creates a beautiful artwork for the viewer.  Since her death, the permanent collection of Reticuláreas is in the Galería de Arte Nacional in Caracas, Venezuela.

Legacy 
Gego died on 17 September 1994 in Caracas, Venezuela. In 1994, her family founded the Fundación Gego to preserve her artistic legacy, which organizes continued exhibitions of her artwork and promotes awareness of Gego's significant contribution to the art world. The Fundación Gego gave the permission to publish Gego's personal writings and testimonies in 2005. These writings, now published, might influence other artists in her innovative and experimental mode of sculpture.

Personal life
In 1940 Gego met Venezuelan urban planner Ernst Gunz at the architectural firm where she worked with other architects to design the Los Caobos housing estate for Luis Roche. They married in October 1940 and opened a furniture studio called ‘Gunz’, where Gego designed lamps and wooden furniture. Together the couple had Tomás (b. 1942) and Barbara (b. 1944). Gego closed Gunz in 1944 in order to spend more time with her children. By 1948 she returned to designing private homes, nightclubs, and restaurants.

In 1951 she separated from Gunz, and in 1952 met artist and graphic designer Gerd Leufert. Gego and Leufert remained partnered for life. This romantic partnership coincides with the development of her artistic career. She begins exhibiting her watercolors, collages, and monotypes in 1954 and is experimenting with creating three-dimensional objects by 1956.

Selected exhibitions
Solo exhibitions
1958 - Gego: Sculptures and Gouaches, Liberia Cruz del Sur, Caracas, 9–24 May
1964 - Lines and interlines: Engravings and Drawings by Gego, Museo de Bellas Artes, Caracas, 2–16 February
1967 - Gego: Sculptures. 1957-1967, Biblioteca Luis Angel Arango, Bogota, 8–30 June
1968 - On Paper: Lithographs by Gego, Museo de Bellas Artes, Caracas, November
1969 - Reticulárea, Museo de Bellas Artes, Caracas, June–July
1970 - Gego Drawings, The Graphic Gallery, San Francisco, 1–17 May
1971 - Gego: Sculpture and Drawing, Betty Parsons Gallery, New York, 13 April – 1 May
1972 - Structures Double Curves, Galeria Conkright, Caracas
1973 - Recent Drawings, Galeria Conkright, Caracas
1975 - Gego: Drawings for Projects, Instituto de Diseno, Fundacion Neumann, Caracas, 6–20 May
1977 - Gego, Museo de Artes Contemporaneo de Caracas Sofia Imber, September
1980 - Variations on Reticuláreas, Sala Cadafe, Museo de Arte Contemporaneo de Caracas Sofia Imber, May
1981 - Reticulárea, Permanent Installation, Sala Gego, Galería de Arte Nacional, Caracas
1982 - Watercolors by Gego, Galería de Arte Nacional, Caracas, 4 Jul – 8 Aug
1984 - Gego: Drawings without Paper, Museo de Bellas Artes, Caracas, June–August
1988 - Gego: Recent Works, Galeria Sotavento, Caracas, March
1994 - Gego: A Look at Her Work, Museo de Arte Contemporaneo de Caracas Sofia Imber, November
1996 - Gego: Drawings, Engravings, Weavings, Centro Cultural Consolidado, Caracas, September–November
2000-01 - Gego: 1955-1990, Museo de Bellas Artes, Caracas October–March
2002-03 - Questioning the Line: Gego, a Selection, 1955-1990, Museum of Fine Arts, Houston
2005 - Gego: Between Transparency and the Invisible, Museum of Fine Arts, Houston, 26 June – 25 September
2007 - Gego: Between Transparency and the Invisible, The Drawing Center, New York, 21 April – 21 July
2011 - Gego: Prints and Drawings 1963-1991, Frederico Seve Gallery, New York, 24 May – 18 August 2011
2012 - Gego: Origin and Encounter, Mastering the Space , Americas Society, New York, 29 September – 8 December
2014 - Gego: Line as Object, Henry Moore Institute, Leeds, 21 July- October 19
2017 - Between the Lines: Gego as Printmaker, Amon Carter Museum of American Art, Fort Worth, 7 February – 6 August 2017
2022 - Gego: Measuring Infinity, Museo Jumex, Mexico City, October 19, 2022 - February 5, 2023

Group exhibitions
 1954: XV Salón Oficial Anual de Arte Venezolano, Museo de Bellas Artes, Caracas 
 1955: Venezolanische Impressionen 1954, Galerie Wolfgang Gurlitt, Munich 
 1959: Pintura y escultura de profesores de la Faculdad de Arquitectura, Universidad Central de Venezuela, Caracas 
 1960: Recent Sculpture, David Herbert Gallery, New York 
 1960/1961: Section Eleven (New Names), Betty Parsons Gallery, New York
 1963: Pintura geométrica venezolana 1950–1960, Galería de Arte del INCIBA, Caracas
 1964: One Hundred Contemporary Prints – Pratt Graphic Art Center, Jewish Museum, New York
 1965: The Responsive Eye, The Museum of Modern Art, New York 
 1966: Art of Latin America since Independence, Yale University Art Gallery, New Haven
 1967: Recent Latin American Art, The Museum of Modern Art, New York
 1968: New Dimension in Lithography. An Exhibition Recently Selected from the Tamarind Lithography Workshop, Fisher and Quinn Galleries, Southern California University 
 1969: El arte cinético y sus orígenes, Ateneo de Caracas, Caracas 
 1969/1970: Latin America. New Paintings and Sculpture. Juan Downey, Agustín Fernández, Gego, Gabriel Morera, Center for Inter-AmericanRelations Art Gallery, New York 
 1971: Tamarind. A Renaissance of Lithography. A Loan Exhibition from the Tamarind Lithography, International Foundation, California 
 1975: Relaciones y contrastes en la pintura venzolana, Museo de Bellas Artes, Caracas, Gego, Otero y Negret, Galería Adler Castillo, Caracas
 1976: Las artes plásticas en Venezuela, Museo de Bellas Artes, Caracas 
 1978: Pequeña historia del dibujo en Venezuela, Estudio Actual, Caracas 
 1982: Spielraum – Raumspiele, Alte Oper, Frankfurt am Main 
 1986: Caracas urbana, Museo de Arte La Rinconada, Caracas 
 1988–1990: The Latin Spirit. Art and Artists in the United States 1920–1970, The Bronx Museum of Art, New York 
 1992: Latin American Artists of the Twentieth Century, Plaza de Armas, Sevilla 
 1996/1997: Inside the Visible. An Elliptical Traverse of 20th Century Art (in, of, and from the Feminine), The Institute of Contemporary Art, Boston 
 1997–1999: Re-Aligning Vision. Alternative Currents in South American Drawing, The Neighborhood Museum, New York 
 1999/2000: The Experimental Exercise of Freedom. Lygia Clark, Gego, Mathias Goeritz, Hélio Oiticica and Mira Schendel, The Museum of Contemporary Art, Los Angeles 
 2000: Force Fields. Phases of the Kinetic, Hayward Gallery, London 
 2000/2001: Heterotopías. Medio siglo sin lugar 1918–1968, Museo Nacional Centro de Arte Reina Sofía, Madrid
 2001: Geometric Abstraction. Latin American Art in the Patricia Phelps de Cisneros Collection, Fogg Art Museum, Harvard University.
 2004: Ruth Vollmer & Gego: Thinking the Line, ZKM Center for Art and Media Karlsruhe, Karlsruhe
 2013: "Zero" Museu Oscar Niemeyer (in collaboration with D.O.P. Foundation and The Goethe Institut), Curitiba, Brazil.
 2013/2014: Zero Iberê Camargo Foundation (in collaboration with D.O.P. Collection and The Goethe Institut), Porto Alegre, RS, Brazil.
 2014: Zero Pinacoteca do Estado de São Paulo (in collaboration with D.O.P. Foundation, The Goethe Institut, Prohelvetia & Alliance), São Paulo, Brazil.
 2016: Revolution in the Making: Abstract Sculpture by Women, 1947–2016, Hauser, Wirth & Schimmel, Los Angeles
 2016: Unfinished: Thoughts Left Visible, The Met Breuer, New York

Selected works
 Vibration in Black, 1957, Painted Aluminum, Fundacion Gego, Caracas
 Split, 1959, Stainless Steel, Dorothea and Leo Rabkin, New York
 , 1961
 Untitled, 1962–1970, Ink on Cardboard, Fundacion Gego, Caracas 
 Torrecilla, 1965–66, Painted stainless steel wire and Iron construction sculpture, Colección D.O.P., Madrid.
 Autobiography of Line, Chinese Ink on Japanese paper, folded and bound, cardboard cover book, Fundacion Gego, Caracas
 Tamarind Series, 1966, Lithographs, Fundacion Gego, Caracas
 Cornice 1, 1967, (Large installation in 6 pieces), each piece: Painted stainless steel and bronze wire construction, Colección D.O.P., Paris.
 , 1970
 , 1971
 Reticulárea cuadrada 71/6 [Square Reticulárea] at The Met Breuer, 1971
 , 1971
 Square Reticulárea, 1971–1976, Steel rods, assembled lead, Fundacion Gego, Caracas
 Reticulárea, 1971–1976, Steel wire, nylon, leader sleeves, Fundacion Cisneros, Caracas
 , 1973
 , 1973
 , 1973
 , 1973
 , 1973
 , 1973-1976
 Drawing Without Paper Series, 1976–1989, Stainless steel, steel rods, crystal beads, painted iron, metal chains, copper wire, Various owners
 Trunk, 1977, Steel wire, metal rods, leader sleeves, Fundacion Gego, Caracas
 , 1980
 Reticulárea Circular (gato o rosa), 1981, Watercolor on Arches, Fundaciòn D.O.P., Madrid
 , 1984 and 1987
 , 1985
 Cornice 2 (Drawing without paper N°88/37), 1988, Metallic pieces, stainless steel, nylon, lead, Fundacion Cisneros, Caracas
 , 1988
 Stream Reticulárea, 1988, Steel wires of different thickness, Banco Mercantil, Caracas
 , 1989
 , 1990

See also
 National Prize of Plastic Arts of Venezuela

References

External links

Gego in the collection of The Museum of Modern Art
Gego – An Artist Described by an Artist, the artist Nathalie David's narrative around creating Gego, a documentary on the painter Gertrud Louise Goldschmidt.

GEGO Foundation website
 GEGO Artista website

1912 births
1994 deaths
20th-century Venezuelan sculptors
German emigrants to Venezuela
Jewish emigrants from Nazi Germany
German sculptors
Jewish women sculptors
Modern artists
Jewish artists
Artists from Hamburg
Academic staff of the Central University of Venezuela
20th-century women artists
Venezuelan women artists
University of Stuttgart alumni
Venezuelan Jews
Venezuelan women engineers
Venezuelan women educators